Rondelle or Rondelles may refer to:
La Rondelle, the corporate headquarters of Air Canada
The Rondelles, an American indie band
Rondelle Yearwood (born 1975), Barbadian cricketer
Rondelle, a type of culinary knife cut

See also
Hans Karl LaRondelle (1929–2011), Dutch-born American Seventh-day Adventist theologian
Rondel (disambiguation)
Rondell (disambiguation)
Roundel (disambiguation)